The Refinery was a restaurant in Seminole Heights, Florida in the United States. It was owned by Michelle and Greg Baker, who offer a weekly menu that includes molecular gastronomy and regional fare using ingredients such as tangerine juice, fennel, fish, acorn squash with bacon and beurre blanc. It received a nomination for the James Beard Award in February 2012. It closed on August 3, 2019.

References

External links
The Refinery website

Restaurants in Tampa, Florida
Defunct restaurants in Florida
2010 establishments in Florida
Restaurants established in 2010
2019 disestablishments in Florida
Restaurants disestablished in 2019